Do Right may refer to: 

Do Right (Paul Davis song) P. Davis 1980
Do Right (Mario song) Akon, Harold Lilly, Giorgio Tuinfort, Mario 2007
Do Right (Glades song), 2017 
"Do Right", a 1974 song by Jackie Brown
"Do Right", song by Jimmie's Chicken Shack from  Bring Your Own Stereo